Dmytro Sula (born 22 February 1994) is a Ukrainian professional footballer who plays as a forward for LNZ Cherkasy.

He is the product of the Chornomorets Odesa school system. Sula made his debut at professional level in Second League during the 2011–12 season on 23 July 2011 in away game against FC Yednist Plysky which his team tied at 2 and Sula scored both goals for the team. Sula has become the author of the first goal of FC Metalist 1925 Kharkiv in the Ukrainian First League.

In December 2018 Sula signed for Inhulets becoming the first player who Inhulets signed that winter.

References

External links
Dmytro Sula at PFL

1994 births
Living people
Footballers from Odesa
Ukrainian footballers
Ukrainian expatriate footballers
Expatriate footballers in Georgia (country)
Ukrainian First League players
FC Real Pharma Odesa players
FC Chornomorets-2 Odesa players
SC Dnipro-1 players
FC Metalist 1925 Kharkiv players
FC Inhulets Petrove players
FC Kremin Kremenchuk players
MFC Mykolaiv players
FC LNZ Cherkasy players
Association football forwards